Girraween National Park is an area of the Granite Belt in the Darling Downs region of Queensland, Australia reserved as a national park. Girraween is known for its spectacular flowers, dramatic landscapes and unique wildlife. Bushwalking and rock climbing are the most popular activities in the park.

Location
The park is situated 40 km south of Stanthorpe. The southern boundary of the park is the state border between Queensland and New South Wales. It is a twin park with Bald Rock National Park, which lies across the border in New South Wales, and features Bald Rock, the second-largest monolith (after Uluru) on the continent. Curiously, South Bald Rock and West Bald Rock lie in Girraween National Park in Queensland, not in Bald Rock National Park in New South Wales.

Features

It features granite landscapes, balancing boulders, clear streams, wetlands, cascades and open forest. The granite outcroppings, such as the Pyramids and Castle Rock at 1112 m, dominate the local scenery. The park contains many kilometres of graded walking trails to the park's major features like the First Pyramid, Second Pyramid, The Sphinx, Turtle Rock, Underground Creek, the Eye of the Needle and Mount Norman - the highest point in the park at 1267 metres. Fire trails can be followed when venturing into the southern and eastern sections of the park. The park has a temperate climate. During winter snow can fall in the area.

Fauna and flora
Girraween is an Aboriginal word meaning 'place of flowers' and the best time to see the local flora is late in July when the Golden Wattle blooms.

The park has abundant fauna, including some that are rarely seen elsewhere in Queensland, such as the common wombat, spotted quoll, lyrebird and the turquoise parrot.

The area is also noted for its diverse flora. The eucalypt forests and heathlands provide habitat for abundant birdlife. In spring, many wildflowers bloom, this led to its being called "place of flowers" in the indigenous language. The area is the only place where the Wallangarra whitegums grow.

In 1992, Taronga Park Zoo staff discovered the rare Bald Rock Creek turtle. The species has only been found within a ten km stretch of the creek.

Facilities 
Camping facilities are provided by the Queensland Department of National Parks at Castle Rock. The site has toilets available, is suitable for caravans and has disabled access to the amenities blocks.

See also

 Protected areas of Queensland

References

Further reading

External links

Queensland Government, Environment and Resource Management, Official site for Girraween National Park
Girraween National Park, Queensland, Australia
Girraween National Park QLD www.exploroz.com

National parks of Queensland
Darling Downs
Protected areas established in 1966
1966 establishments in Australia